Tanzanian Air Services Ltd, operating as Tanzanair, is an air charter company in Tanzania. Founded in 1969 by Dinos John Samaras, it was the first private air operator in the country. It has an engineering facility near Terminal I of the Julius Nyerere International Airport for aircraft maintenance. It is also an authorised Cessna service centre.

Fleet

The Tanzanair fleet consists of the following aircraft (as of October 2012):

Accidents and incidents

22 August 2013: A Beechcraft B200C Super King Air (registration 5H-TZW) on a charter flight from Bukoba to Zanzibar, force-landed in Lake Manyara following a loss of engine power.  The pilot announced he had lost one engine at 21,000 feet while en route and he decided to divert to Arusha. During the descent, at 16,000 feet, the remaining engine also seized. He then ditched the plane in Lake Manyara. All aboard (6 passengers and the pilot) were rescued by fishermen.

References

External links
Official website

Airlines of Tanzania
Airlines established in 1969
1960s establishments in Tanzania